Eresina toroensis is a butterfly in the family Lycaenidae. It is found in Uganda, the Democratic Republic of the Congo (Ituri, North Kivu and Lualaba), Kenya and Zambia. Its habitat consists of dense, primary forests.

References

Butterflies described in 1921
Poritiinae